The Gridone, Ghiridone or Monte Limidario is a mountain of the Lepontine Alps, overlooking Lake Maggiore near Brissago. At 2,188 metres above sea level, its summit straddles the border between Italy and Switzerland.

The summit can be easily reached from both sides, although it is nearly 2,000 metres above Lake Maggiore.

See also
List of mountains of Ticino
List of most isolated mountains of Switzerland

References

External links

 Gridone on Summitpost
 Gridone on Hikr
 360 Degree Panoramic Video from summit of Gridone

Mountains of the Alps
Two-thousanders of Switzerland
Mountains of Piedmont
Italy–Switzerland border
International mountains of Europe
Mountains of Ticino
Lepontine Alps
Mountains of Switzerland